Joachim Govertsz Camphuysen (1601, Gorinchem – 1659, Amsterdam), was a Dutch Golden Age landscape painter.

Biography
According to the RKD he was the son of a surgeon and the nephew of the painter Dirk Rafaelsz Camphuysen. His  brother Rafaël Govertsz Camphuysen studied with him, and his cousin of the same name (Dirk's son Rafaël) also became a painter. His sister Lysbeth married the artist Aert van der Neer who followed his style. He also influenced the painter Pieter van Asch.

References

Joachim Govertsz Camphuysen on Artnet

1601 births
1659 deaths
Dutch Golden Age painters
Dutch male painters
People from Gorinchem